The Sleeman Centre (formerly the Guelph Sports and Entertainment Centre) is a 4,715 seat multi-purpose facility in Guelph, Ontario, Canada. The Sleeman Centre has hosted concerts, sporting and family events as well as trade shows and conferences. It is home to the Guelph Storm of the major junior Ontario Hockey League. The arena hosted the 2002 Memorial Cup and the 2008 Founders Cup tournament.

History
A new arena for Guelph had been in discussion for well over a decade by Guelph City Council. The owners of the Guelph Platers, the OHL team at Guelph Memorial Gardens at the time, moved to Owen Sound in 1989 with one of the stated reasons was the lack of a new arena. Serious talks of a new arena for the Guelph Storm, which moved from Hamilton, Ontario in 1991 and played out of the cramped Guelph Memorial Gardens, did not get started until the mid to late 1990s after the Guelph Storm's failed attempt to host the Memorial Cup.

Finding a suitable location, as well as the cost, was debated for many years. Many sites had been looked at including the Memorial Gardens site, the Fountain Street parking lot, and in the west end of the city where there was plans to build a new recreation and community complex. When the Eaton's store at the Guelph Eaton Centre closed down, the city investigated the potential of building an arena where the now empty store stood. The 5,000-seat arena was then built on the site of the former Eaton's store after the purchase of the mall in 1998 and demolition of the back section where the Eaton's store once stood.

The city entered a public–private partnership agreement with Nustadia in 1998 to build and operate the Guelph Sports and Entertainment Centre for 30 years. The city contributed half of the cost of the project and also guaranteed a  loan for capital costs, which was to be paid back by Nustadia. However, in 2001, the city of Guelph had to take over the  "senior" loan for the Guelph Sports and Entertainment Centre, plus the  "subordinated" loan the city was already paying due to Nustadia failing to make a June 1 quarterly payment of $181,250. The city had to pay  over the a four-year span to make Nustadia's payments on its bank loan for the downtown arena. Nustadia stated that difficulties in making payments were attributed to a number of factors, including the failure to generate anticipated restaurant and food court revenue and lower-than-projected ticket sales from Guelph Storm hockey games. Nustadia expected 3,500 people per game but the average was closer to 2,800 in 2000–01. A four-year reprieve was granted by Guelph City Council so that Nustadia could operate under ideal conditions. Nustadia was to repay the money but with a clause in the agreement between the city and the developer giving either side the ability to walk away with no financial obligations to the other. That deal expired on June 30, 2005.

In 2005, after the four year reprieve, the city took over ownership of the Guelph Sports and Entertainment Centre because Nustadia Developments Inc. decided to walk away from the downtown facility, completing a controversial transaction that had been expected for a few months. In 2009, the City of Guelph announced plans to upgrade the Sleeman Centre starting spring 2010. This upgrade consisted of adding a video score clock to the arena that has four video replay screens as well as two LED rings at the top and bottom of the scoreboard.

From 2009 to 2018, Guelph's junior B team, the Guelph Hurricanes (formerly known as the Guelph Dominators) moved to the Sleeman Centre for their regular season home games. The team moved back to Cambridge, Ontario, as the Cambridge Redhawks in 2018.

Sleeman sponsorship

In June 2007, Sleeman Breweries and the City of Guelph finalized a $1.2 million sponsorship deal that gives the beer company exclusive naming rights to the Guelph Sports & Entertainment Centre until 2020. In 2021, it was announced that deal was renewed through to June 30, 2030, for $1 million.

Layout
In the main arena the seats are blue, with private suites located one level above the main seating area. The club seats are behind the player benches. There is also a restaurant behind the club seats as well as a 200 level VIP section on the same level of the private boxes. The arena has a standard four-sided scoreboard, which is blue to go with the arena theme colour. The concourse is wide and horseshoe shaped, as fans have to either exit to Old Quebec Street food court or go through the restaurant. Fans can walk all the way around the arena with uninterrupted views of the action on the ice.

References

External links
Sleeman Centre official website
Guelph Storm

Buildings and structures in Guelph
Guelph Storm
Indoor arenas in Ontario
Indoor ice hockey venues in Canada
Ontario Hockey League arenas
Sports venues completed in 2000
Sports venues in Ontario
Tourist attractions in Guelph
2000 establishments in Ontario